Mishar Tatar or Misher Tatar, also Western Tatar (Мишәр, Mişär, Мишәр Татар, Mişär Tatar, көнбатыш татар, könbatış tatar), is a dialect of Tatar spoken by Mishar Tatars mainly located at Penza, Ulyanovsk, Orenburg, Nizhny Novgorod, Samara, Volgograd, Saratov oblasts of Russia and in Tatarstan, Bashkortostan, Chuvashia and Mordovia of Russian Federation and Finland. 

Some linguists (Radlov, Samoylovich) think that Mishar Tatar belongs to  the Kypchak-Cuman group of languages rather than to the Kypchak-Bulgar group.

This is the dialect spoken by the Tatar minority of Finland. The origins of the Tatar community living in Finland rest upon the merchants coming from the Volga-Ural region of Russia in the 1860s and most of the people in this community came from Sergach Mishar Tatar villages in the province of Nizhny Novgorod. The success of the first Tatar migrations caused other villagers to migrate to Finland.

Dialects
Mishar Tatar dialects (сөйләшлер) are according to Makhmutova two (Ch and Ts) or according to Gabdulkhay Akhatov three (Ch, Ts and mixed) groups.

In the Western (Mişär) dialect Ç is pronounced  (southern or Lambir Mişärs) and as [ts] (northern Mişärs or Nizhgars). C is pronounced . There are no differences between v and w, q and k, g and ğ in the Mişär dialect. The Cyrillic alphabet doesn't have special letters for q, ğ and w, so Mişär speakers have no difficulty reading Tatar written in Cyrillic.

Classification of Mishar Tatar dialects:
Ch-dialects or Southern Mishar: пытчак, pıtçak < Kazan пычак, pıçak (knife)
Temnikovsky dialect — western rayons (esp. Temnikovsky) of Mordovia, south-eastern part of Penza oblast.
Lyambirsky dialect — eastern part (esp. Lyambirsky) of Mordovia.
Bashkortostan dialect — Birsk, Karaidelsky, Mishkinsky rayons of Bashkortostan.
Sharlyk dialect — Sharlyk of Orenburg oblast.
Orenburg dialect — Orenburg oblast.
Dialects of  Volgograd and Saratov oblasts.
Kuznetsk dialect — Kuznetsk of Penza oblast. A mixed dialect by Akhatov.
Khvalynsk dialect — south Ulyanovsk oblast (Khvalynsk). A mixed dialect by Akhatov.
Ts-dialects or Northern Mishar: пыцак, pıtsak < Kazan пычак, pıçak (knife)
Sergachsky dialect — Sergachsky of Nizhny Novgorod oblast.
Drozhzhanovsky dialect — Drozhzhanovsky rayon of Tatarstan and Chuvashia
Chistopolsky dialect (mixed) — Chistopolsky of Tatarstan and Samara oblast.
Melekessky dialect (contingently) — northern rayons (esp. Melekessky) of Ulyanovsk oblast.

References 

Finnish Tatars
Mishar Tatars
Tatar language
Turkic languages